Phallotorynus is a genus of poeciliids native to southern Brazil, northern Argentina, and Paraguay.

Species
There are currently six recognized species in this genus:
 Phallotorynus dispilos Lucinda, R. de S. Rosa & R. E. dos Reis, 2005
 Phallotorynus fasciolatus Henn, 1916
 Phallotorynus jucundus R. Ihering (pt), 1930
 Phallotorynus pankalos Lucinda, R. de S. Rosa & R. E. dos Reis, 2005
 Phallotorynus psittakos Lucinda, R. de S. Rosa & R. E. dos Reis, 2005
 Phallotorynus victoriae Oliveros, 1983

References

Poeciliidae
Fish of South America
Freshwater fish genera
Ray-finned fish genera